Cantabria is one of the sixteen autonomous communities of Spain. It is divided into 102 municipalities, in accordance with the organizations of territories put forth in Article 137 of the 1978 Constitution of Spain:

Municipal boundaries are defined in Spain's Ley Reguladora de las Bases del Régimen Local. These include "the basic local entity of the territorial organization of the state", with "legal status and full capability for the completion of their ends"  and their elements are "the territory, the population, and the organization".

The administration and the governance of municipalities proceeds from a low level organ termed the local government or mayoralty, which is headed by a single person: an alcalde. Until 2011, the municipalities of Tresviso and Pesquera had been governed through a direct democratic system, but with the change in the law, both abandoned this system in order to adopt representative government forms that use a mayor-council system.

In general, municipalities are subdivided into various localities, one of which serves as the municipal seat and usually plays host to the town hall. Some municipalities take the name of one of their localities—be it their municipal seat or not—while others contain a name distinct from any of the localities therein. There also exist other sub-municipal government organs that enjoy some extent of autonomy in their management. These are called minor local entities, which correspond to villages, parishes, or districts, whose representation resides in a neighborhood board. Each of these entities has a municipal code composed of five or six numbers; the first two correspond to the provincial code, while the next three numbers refer to the municipality within the particular province. The sixth and final number is a check digit that is used in order to identify errors.

One should note that the Community of Campoo-Cabuérniga does not constitute a municipality per se, but rather is a sui generis territorial entity within Cantabria. Due to its unique size and makeup, the management of the locale is shared between the surrounding municipalities of Hermandad de Campoo de Suso, Cabuérniga, Los Tojos, and Ruente.

Municipal elections 

Municipal elections are held the fourth Sunday of May every four years, coinciding with the date of the elections for the Parliament of Cantabria.

The electoral system is regulated by the Organic Law of the General Electoral Regime (LOREG) and is based upon voting on party lists and assigning councilors in line with the D'Hondt method. The electoral threshold for a party to gain representation is five percent of the valid votes cast.

The citizens of member countries of the European Union who maintain residency in Cantabria have the right to vote and run for office, in accordance with the laws that have been established in order to comply with EU Directive 94/80/CE.

The citizens of countries that posses reciprocity agreements with Spain are able to vote in Cantabrian elections in the same manner as EU citizens. Countries with such agreements include: Argentina, Bolivia, Brasil, Burkina Faso, Cabo Verde, Chile, Colombia, South Korea, Ecuador, Iceland, New Zealand, Paraguay, Perú, Trinidad and Tobago, Uruguay, and Venezuela. Additionally, citizens of Spain who reside in some foreign countries, such as Norway, also are able to exercise their right to vote in Cantabrian elections, even though there is no reciprocity agreement between Norway and Spain.

The number of councilors a municipality elects depends on its population:

 Up to 100 inhabitants: 3 councilors.
 From 101 to 250: 5 councilors.
 From 251 to 1000: 7 councilors.
 From 1001 to 2000: 9 councilors.
 From 2001 to 5000: 11 councilors.
 From 5001 to 10,000: 13 councilors.
 From 10,001 to 20,000: 17 councilors.
 From 20,001 to 50,000: 21 councilors.
 From 50,001 to 100,000: 25 councilors.

Map

List of municipalities

See also 

 List of municipalities of Spain

References 

Municipalities of Spain by province
Municipalities in Cantabria
Lists of municipalities in Spain